Damian Timan (born 5 March 2001) is a Dutch footballer who plays as a midfielder for the Jong Cambuur.

Career statistics

Club

Notes

References

2001 births
Living people
Dutch footballers
Netherlands youth international footballers
Association football midfielders
PSV Eindhoven players
Jong PSV players
SC Cambuur players
Eerste Divisie players
Footballers from North Holland